James Patrick Green (born 30 May 1950) is an American prelate of the Roman Catholic Church who from 2006 to 2022 served as apostolic nuncio to a variety of countries including to several Scandinavian countries from 2017 to 2022.

Early years 
Green was born on May 30, 1950, in Philadelphia, Pennsylvania. He studied for the priesthood and was ordained a priest of the Archdiocese of Philadelphia on May 15,  1976. During his early years in the diplomatic service of the Holy See, he served in Papua New Guinea, South Korea, the Netherlands, Spain, and  Denmark. He then spent a year in Taiwan as chargé d'affaires and then worked in Rome beginning in late 2002.

Apostolic nuncio 
On August 17, 2006, Pope Benedict XVI appointed Green as titular archbishop of Altinum, apostolic nuncio to South Africa and Namibia, and apostolic delegate to Botswana.

Green was consecrated bishop on September 6, 2006, by Cardinal Secretary of State Angelo Sodano. That same day, Green was as appointed apostolic delegate  to Lesotho., On September 23, 2006, he was appointed as apostolic delegate to Swaziland.

On October 15, 2011, Green was appointed as apostolic nuncio to Peru. On April 6, 2017, he became apostolic nuncio to Sweden and to Iceland; on June 13 to Denmark; on October 12 to Finland; and on October 18 to Norway.

Pope Francis accepted his resignation from his posts as nuncio on April 30, 2022.

See also
List of diplomatic missions of the Holy See

References

Apostolic Nuncios to Scandinavia
Apostolic Nuncios to Peru
Apostolic Nuncios to South Africa
Apostolic Nuncios to Namibia
Apostolic Nuncios to Eswatini
Apostolic Nuncios to Denmark
Apostolic Nuncios to Iceland
Apostolic Nuncios to Finland
Apostolic Nuncios to Norway
Apostolic Nuncios to Sweden
Roman Catholic Archdiocese of Philadelphia
21st-century American Roman Catholic titular archbishops
Clergy from Philadelphia
1950 births
Living people